Orłowski, Orlowski, Orlovsky, Arlouski (see below for further forms) is a surname originating from Proto-Slavic *orьlъ ("eagle"). It has various spellings in different countries. In certain languages, it also has feminine forms.

Related surnames

People

Orlowski, Orlowska
 Aleksander Orłowski (1777–1832), Polish painter
 Alice Orlowski (1903–1976), German SS official
 Andrew Orlowski (born 1966), British columnist
 Ewa Orłowska (born 1935), Polish logician
 Hans Orlowski (1894–1967), German woodcut artist and painter
 Jeff Orlowski, American filmmaker
 Jerzy Orłowski(1925–2015), Polish footballer
 Maria Orłowska (born 1951), Polish computer scientist
 Milan Orlowski (born 1952), Czech table tennis player
 Richard Orlowski (born 1957), Polish-born American soccer coach
 Stefanja Orlowska (born 1987), Australian actress and writer
 Teresa Orlowski (born 1953), Polish-born adult film actress and producer 
 Witold Orłowski (born 1962), Polish professor of economics
 Wojciech Orłowski (born 1981), Polish wrestler and mixed martial artist
 Zuzanna Orłowska (died after 1583), mistress of Polish King Sigismund II Augustus

Orlovsky, Orlovskaya
 Alina Orlovskaya, real name of Alina Orlova (born 1988), Lithuanian singer and musician
 Boris Orlovsky (1793–1837), Russian academician and sculptor
 Dan Orlovsky (born 1983), American football player
 Peter Orlovsky (1933–2010), American poet
 Stephen Orlofsky (born 1944), American lawyer

Other
 Andrei Arlovski (born 1979), Belarusian mixed martial artist
 Fred Orlofsky (born 1937), American gymnast
 Radzislaw Arlowski (born 1970), Belarusian footballer

See also
 
 
 Orlov (surname)

Polish-language surnames
Russian-language surnames